Ovsište is a village in the municipality of Topola, Serbia. According to the 2002 census, the village has a population of 630 people.

Notable
Ovsište is a birthplace of a most famous Serbian satirical writer Radoje Domanović.

References

Populated places in Šumadija District